The Great Northern Depot or Great Northern Passenger Depot may refer to:

Minnesota
Great Northern Passenger Depot (Alexandria, Minnesota)
Great Northern Depot (Bemidji, Minnesota)
Minneapolis Great Northern Depot, Minneapolis, Minnesota
Great Northern Depot (Princeton, Minnesota)
Great Northern Depot (Wayzata, Minnesota)

Mississippi
New Orleans Great Northern Railroad Passenger Depot, a National Register of Historic Places listing in Hinds County, Mississippi
New Orleans Great Northern Railroad Depot, a National Register of Historic Places listing in Lawrence County, Mississippi
New Orleans and Great Northern Railroad Depot-Tylertown, a National Register of Historic Places listing in Walthall County, Mississippi

Montana
Great Northern Railway Depot (Butte, Montana), currently a bar and night club in Butte, Montana
Great Northern Railway Depot (Kalispell, Montana), a National Register of Historic Places listing in Flathead County, Montana
Great Northern Railway Passenger and Freight Depot and Division Office, Whitefish, Montana

North Dakota
Great Northern Passenger Depot - Fargo
Great Northern Freight Warehouse and Depot, Grand Forks, North Dakota
Great Northern Railway Depot (Mayville, North Dakota)
Great Northern Passenger Depot (Rugby, North Dakota)
Great Northern Railway Underpass, Stanley, North Dakota

South Dakota
Great Northern Railway Passenger and Freight Depot

Texas
International & Great Northern Railroad Passenger Depot, a National Register of Historic Places listing in Milam County, Texas
International & Great Northern Railroad Passenger Station, a National Register of Historic Places listing in Bexar County, Texas

Washington
Great Northern Depot (Anacortes, Washington), a National Register of Historic Places listing in Skagit County, Washington
Great Northern Passenger Station (Bellingham, Washington), a National Register of Historic Places listing in Whatcom County, Washington
Great Northern Depot (Skykomish, Washington)

See also
Great Northern Railway Steam Locomotive No. 1355 and Tender 1451, Sioux City, Iowa
Great Northern Railway Company Bridge, Cass Lake, Minnesota, a National Register of Historic Places listing in Cass County, Minnesota
Great Northern Implement Company, Minneapolis, Minnesota
Great Northern Railway Buildings, Glacier National Park, Montana
Great Northern Freight Warehouse, Fargo, North Dakota